James M. Gwyn House, also known as Springdale, is a historic home located near Cruso, Haywood County, North Carolina. It was built about 1888, and is a boxy two-story, three bay, center-hall frame structure sheathed in weatherboard.  The house is embellished with details derived from the Italianate and Eastlake movement styles.  It features a wraparound porch.

It was listed on the National Register of Historic Places in 1984.

References

Houses on the National Register of Historic Places in North Carolina
Italianate architecture in North Carolina
Houses completed in 1888
Houses in Haywood County, North Carolina
National Register of Historic Places in Haywood County, North Carolina